Lex van Delden (born Alexander Zwaap; 21 June 1947 – 6 October 2010) was a Dutch actor and singer. His film credits include A Bridge Too Far, Soldier of Orange and Bad Timing. He was the son of composer Lex van Delden.

Filmography

References

External links
 

20th-century Dutch male actors
Dutch male singers
1947 births
2010 deaths
21st-century Dutch male actors
Dutch male film actors
Male actors from Amsterdam
Musicians from Amsterdam